Unione Cestistica Casalpusterlengo, also known as U.C.C. and Assigeco Casalpusterlengo, is an Italian professional basketball club base in Codogno, Lombardy.

History
The team was founded in 1977 by Franco Curioni, who remains its president to this day. In 2004 Casalpusterlengo reached the third division Serie B1. Five years later the team was promoted to the professional LegaDue, playing two seasons before withdrawing in 2011 due to financial difficulties.

Arena
In order to comply with the league's capacity regulations during the years it played in LegaDue, its home arena was PalaCastellotti in Lodi.

Notable players

  Mike Hall 1 season: 2019–20
  Ruben Boykin 1 season: 2010–11
  Paul Marigney 1 season: 2010–11
  Peter Ezugwu 1 season: 2010–11
  Marcus Hatten 1 season: 2009–10
  Jakub Wojciechowski 1 season: 2009–10
  Mario Boni 2 seasons: 2006–08
  Pietro Aradori 3 seasons: 2003–06
  Danilo Gallinari 1 season: 2004–05
  Vittorio Gallinari 1 season: 1995–96

External links 
 Official website (in Italian)

Basketball teams established in 1977
Basketball teams in Lombardy
1977 establishments in Italy